The 1st National Hockey League All-Star Game took place at Maple Leaf Gardens, home of the Toronto Maple Leafs, on October 13, 1947. The game saw the Maple Leafs play a team of NHL all-stars. The All-Stars won the game 4–3.

Founding
The NHL All-Star Game originated from the Players Committee and was approved on May 23, 1947. For the site of the All-Star Charity Game, it was applied for by Toronto and Chicago, with Chicago receiving the second game, in 1948. It was agreed that proceeds would be divided whereby one-third would go to Toronto charities, and two-thirds would go to the Players Emergency (Benevolent and Disability) Fund. At a later meeting in September 1947, the players agreed to set up a pension fund, with $900 from every player going into the fund and 25 cents from the sale of every playoff ticket and the two-thirds of the All-Star Game proceeds to go into the fund.

Pre-game festivities
The players selected for the game attended a Toronto Argonauts-Hamilton Tiger-Cats football game on the day of the Game. That was followed by a dinner at the Royal York Hotel. The players were given miniature engraved gold pucks. There were extra gifts for the Maple Leafs, who had won the Stanley Cup the previous spring. The Leafs received gold cufflinks from the Ontario government and a free lifetime pass from Conn Smythe. Sponsors gave each player a coat, a hat, a table lighter, golf balls, a tie, cigarette boxes, pocket knives, team photos, silver tea trays, engraved gold watches and silver watch chains.

Game description
The All-Stars wore red sweaters with white stars across the chest above a white and red NHL shield, and white and blue stripes running down the shoulders and sleeves. This uniform would be used through the 1955 All-Star Game, and later adapted for the Campbell Conference All-Stars in the 1992 game. The referees wore dark blue sweaters. The Leafs wore their white sweaters.

The game was well-contested and was physical. Ken Reardon was assessed a major penalty for cutting Bob Goldham on the head after a dirty cross-check. Reardon was involved in a stick-swinging incident between himself and Bill Ezinicki and Gus Mortson. Maurice Richard was placed on a line with Ted Lindsay. The pair, who would often fight it out in regular games did not share a word, according to Richard.

Summary

 Referee: King Clancy
 Linesmen: Jim Primeau, Ed Mepham
 Attendance: 14,169

Source: Podnieks(2000), p. 25.

Rosters

Source: Podnieks(2000), p. 25.

See also
1947–48 NHL season

References
 

01st National Hockey League All-Star Game
All
1947
Ice hockey competitions in Toronto
1947 in Ontario
1940s in Toronto